Nadavara or Nadavaru in a caste.

The word has been has been used in reference to two Indian castes from Karnataka.

Bunts
Nadavars of Uttara Kannada

References

Karnataka society
Social groups of Karnataka